Kimberly Bruckner Baldwin (born June 19, 1970, in Chicago, Illinois) is an American road cyclist.  She represented her nation at the 2001, 2002, 2004 and 2006 UCI Road World Championships.

References

External links
 
 

1970 births
Living people
American female cyclists
Pan American Games medalists in cycling
Pan American Games gold medalists for the United States
Cyclists from Chicago
Cyclists at the 2003 Pan American Games
Medalists at the 2003 Pan American Games
21st-century American women
20th-century American women